Scopula duplinupta is a moth of the family Geometridae. It is found in South Africa.

The wingspan is 24–29 mm.

References

Moths described in 1982
duplinupta
Moths of Africa